Qiao may refer to:

 Qiao (surname), a common pronunciation for some Chinese surnames, such as 喬 and 橋.
 Qiao (橋), Chinese character for "bridge".
 Qiao (譙), a location in ancient China which corresponds to present-day Bozhou, Anhui. also an ancient Chinese surname.